Nightwing is a superhero appearing in American comic books published by DC Comics. The character has appeared in various incarnations; the identity is adopted by Dick Grayson when he leaves his role as Batman's partner and sidekick Robin.

Although Nightwing is commonly associated with Batman, the title and concept have origins in classic Superman stories. The original Nightwing was an identity assumed by Superman when stranded on the Kryptonian city of Kandor with Jimmy Olsen. Drawing inspiration from Batman and Robin, the two protect Kandor as the superheroes Nightwing and Flamebird. Following the Crisis on Infinite Earths continuity reboot in 1985, Nightwing was re-imagined as a legendary vigilante from Krypton whose story inspires Dick Grayson's choice of name when he leaves behind his Robin identity.

Other stories set among the Batman family of characters have seen acquaintances and friends of Grayson briefly assume the title, including his fellow Robin alumnus Jason Todd. Meanwhile, Superman stories have seen Superman's adopted son Chris Kent and Power Girl take up the name for brief turns as Nightwing. Various other characters have taken the name in stories set outside DC's main continuity as well.

In 2013, Nightwing placed 5th on IGN's Top 25 Heroes of DC Comics and Grayson as Nightwing was ranked the #1 Sexiest Male Character in Comics by ComicsAlliance in 2013.

Fictional character biography

Pre-Crisis Era

Superman

Nightwing is first depicted in the story "Superman in Kandor" in Superman #158 (January 1963). It is an alias used by Superman in pre-Crisis stories. The story is set in Kandor, a Kryptonian city that was shrunken and preserved in a bottle by Brainiac. In Kandor, Superman has no superpowers, and is branded an outlaw there due to a misunderstanding.

To disguise themselves, Superman and Jimmy Olsen create vigilante identities inspired by Batman and Robin. Because neither bats nor robins lived on Krypton, Superman chooses the names of two birds owned by his Kandorian friend Nor-Kan: Nightwing for himself, and Flamebird for Jimmy. Nightwing and Flamebird rename Nor-Kan's underground laboratory as the "Nightcave", and use it as their secret headquarters. They also convert Nor-Kan's automobile into their "Nightmobile", and use "jet-belts" to fly into battle.

In Superman's Pal, Jimmy Olsen #69 (June 1963), "The Dynamic Duo of Kandor" introduces Nightwing's dog Nighthound. In "The Feud Between Batman and Superman" in World's Finest #143 (August 1964), Batman and Robin themselves visit Kandor with Superman and Olsen and the two Dynamic Duos team up.

Van-Zee
In Superman Family #183 (May/June 1977), Superman's look-alike second cousin Van-Zee and his niece's husband Ak-Var take up the Nightwing and Flamebird identities. The vigilantes take on crime in their city as had Superman and Olsen before them.

Dick Grayson

After Dick Grayson gives up his Robin mantle, he wonders for a while about his new role. When the Titans are threatened with a new foe, he takes on the mantle of Nightwing, in a homage to the Graysons, Batman, and Superman. This is the storyline that also introduces Slade Wilson A.K.A. Deathstroke the Terminator.

Post-Crisis

Kryptonian mythological figure
Post-Crisis, there is a different originator of the Nightwing identity. Several hundred years before the birth of Kal-El, there was a Kryptonian man who was cast out from his family and decided to take on crime as the vigilante Nightwing. When Superman tells Dick Grayson of this story, Dick takes the name for himself.

Dick Grayson

Dick Grayson became Nightwing after Batman fired him from his own mantle of Robin for getting shot by Joker. Grayson's Flamebird was Bette Kane. After The New Teen Titans, Nightwing teamed up with old friend Speedy in Action Comics #613-618 & #627-634 later collected in New Friends Old Enemies. He featured in his own solo Nightwing series from 1995 to 2009; after Wayne's apparent death, Dick became the new Batman, retiring his Nightwing mantle temporarily.

Grayson's Nightwing costume was a high-tech suit specially designed for his high-flying acrobatic style. His gauntlets and boots each contained eight compartments in which he could store items. They had a self-destruct feature built into them, similar to the ones in Batman's utility belt, and, as another security measure, the suit contained a one-use-only taser charge, which automatically emitted a high-voltage electrical shock when someone attempted to tamper with either the boots or gauntlets.

Each gauntlet's sections could contain a wide array of equipment, such as sonic or smoke pellets, modified batarangs ("Wing-Dings"), knockout gas capsules, throwable tracers, and a sedative-tipped dart launcher. The right gauntlet was also equipped with a 100,000-volt stun gun. Like the gauntlets, his boot compartments could carry vital equipment such as flares, a rebreather as protection against any airborne non-contact toxins, a mini-computer equipped with fax, modem, GPS, and a minidisk re-writable drive. Other items were lock picks, a first-aid kit, a mini-cellphone, flexi-cuffs, antitoxin assortment, wireless listening devices, and a small flashlight. After coming to New York, Dick added a black utility belt to his costume, eliminating the need for his boots and gauntlets.

Held in spring-loaded pouches in the back of his costume, Dick carried a pair of eskrima clubs made from an unbreakable polymer that were wielded as both offensive and defensive weapons. Some depictions display these tools with the mechanism to shoot a grappling hook attached to a swing line, while, in other instances, they can act as "line guns" similar to the ones Batman uses. The clubs could also be thrown with such skill by Grayson (and possibly due to their design) that they would ricochet off walls and objects to hit multiple targets, then return to his hands. These clubs also have the capability to be linked together as well as grow in size to make a staff, as depicted in many series, such as Teen Titans and Young Justice (Robin uses these weapons).

Superman
In 2001's Superman: The Man of Steel #111, Superman and Lois Lane travel to a version of Krypton later revealed to have been created by the villainous Brainiac 13 and based on Jor-El's favorite period in Kryptonian history. Labeled as criminals, Superman and Lois become fugitives, adopting the Nightwing and Flamebird identities to survive, just as had Superman and Olsen in Superman (vol. 2) #158.

Tad Ryerstad
In Blüdhaven, a sociopath named Tad Ryerstad becomes a superhero, inspired by the retired hero Tarantula. He takes his name, "Nite-Wing", from an all-night deli specializing in chicken wings. Unstable, Nite-Wing beats people for minor offenses. Nite-Wing is shot on his first night out and Dick Grayson, as Blüdhaven's protector Nightwing, defends him from Blockbuster's gang, who think it is Nightwing who has been injured. After Nite-Wing is released from the hospital, he kills the gang who put him there. Not realizing how violent Ryerstad is, Grayson agrees to train him. The two attack Blockbuster's organization, but are captured and separated. After an undercover FBI agent frees Nite-Wing, Ryerstad beats him to death, and when Grayson realizes what he has done, Ryerstad flees. Nightwing subsequently tracks down and has Nite-Wing arrested by the police. In prison, Ryerstad is cell-mates with Torque (Dudley Soames), but the two escape by drugging the prison guard Amygdala.

Jason Todd

Nightwing (vol. 2) #118-122 run features Jason Todd wearing Dick's costume and killing in New York City which led to a police manhunt against Nightwing.

Cheyenne Freemont
The "One Year Later" storyline features a metahuman fashion designer named Cheyenne Freemont donning a modified Nightwing costume to help Grayson.

Cheyenne first met Dick when they had a one-night stand together. They only exchanged first names the next morning, Cheyenne stating she's superstitious. The two had breakfast together and then he left. When he left another man walked into her apartment. When he assaulted her, she hit him with a telekinetic blast.

Dick found out Cheyenne was a fashion designer from a friend of his from Bludhaven. She ran into Dick again after he accidentally became a model for her. After seeing newspaper clippings of Nightwing (Jason Todd) she started creating superhero themed designs. Cheyenne wore a Nightwing costume to help Dick and Jason from a metahuman monster named Jakob. He ate her, but she used her powers to blow him up from the inside. Due to recent events she was left broke and soon left New York City.

Power Girl
In Supergirl (vol. 5) #6 (April 2006), Power Girl and Supergirl assume the identities of Nightwing and Flamebird in a story set in Kandor, just as in the original pre-Crisis stories featuring Superman.

Chris Kent

Chris Kent, son of General Zod, was Nightwing during Superman: New Krypton. In that storyline, Superman was coming to terms with the death of his adoptive father; he was also dealing with 100,000 Kryptonians now living on Earth, which he had released from the bottled cities on Brainiac's ship (the same ship that contained the lost Kryptonian city of Kandor). At the end of the fourth issue of the arc, a new Nightwing and Flamebird appear in Superman's Fortress of Solitude to stop two of Zod's followers (who were living in Kandor) from releasing the Kryptonian General from his Phantom Zone imprisonment. While guarding the projector to prevent any Zod loyalists from freeing him from the Phantom Zone, both Flamebird and Nightwing exhibit powers that are not inherent to normal Kryptonians. Flamebird projects flames from her hands, and Nightwing uses "natural tactile telekinesis".

The pair seems to be stronger than normal Kryptonians: they knock out the two Zod loyalists with one blow apiece. In a later appearance, the duo is seen in Gotham City. Unlike previous portrayals, it seems Flamebird believes herself to be the dominant partner. When the Kryptonians led by Zod and Alura flee to a new Krypton orbiting the Sun, Nightwing and Flamebird stay in Gotham. In Action Comics #875, that Nightwing is revealed as the son of Zod and Ursa, Chris Kent. The "Nightwing" identity is revealed to be based on a mythical Kryptonian creature, whose existence is intertwined with that of its partner beast, the Flamebird. Inside the Phantom Zone Chris' mind interfaced with a piece of Brainiac technology, awakening a long-dormant connection to the Nightwing, and linking his mind to that of Thara Ak-Var, who had a connection to the Flamebird.

Alternative versions
 Terry McGinnis briefly moonlights as Nightwing in Batman Beyond #4, after Detective Ben Singleton claims to know Dick Grayson's past as Nightwing, which turns into a media fiasco.

Other uses in DC comics
 In the DC Comics Tangent Comics series, "Nightwing" is a secret government organization which appears throughout the series. Headed by Marcus Moore and Francis "Black Lightning" Powell, who act to protect the US and also conceal the true nature of The Atom's involvement in the Cuban Missile Crisis.

Ongoing series

Story arcs

Based on Nightwing's increasing popularity, DC Comics decided to test the character's possibilities with a one-shot book and then a miniseries.

First, in Nightwing: Alfred's Return #1 (1995), Grayson travels to England to find Alfred, who resigns from Bruce Wayne's service following the events of KnightSaga. Before returning to Gotham City together, they prevent a plot by British terrorists to destroy the undersea "Channel Tunnel" in the English Channel.

Later on, with the Nightwing miniseries (September 1995 to December 1995, written by Dennis O'Neil with Greg Land as artist), Dick briefly considers retiring from being Nightwing forever before family papers uncovered by Alfred reveal a possible link between the murder of the Flying Graysons and the Crown Prince of Kravia. Journeying to Kravia, Nightwing (in his third costume) helps to topple the murderous Kravian leader and prevent an ethnic cleansing, while learning his parents' true connection to the Prince.

Blüdhaven
In 1996, following the success of the miniseries, DC Comics launched a monthly solo series featuring Nightwing (written by Chuck Dixon, with art by Scott McDaniel), in which he patrols Gotham's neighboring municipality of Blüdhaven.

At Batman's request, Dick journeys to this former whaling town-turned-industrial center to investigate a number of murders linked to Gotham City gangster Black Mask. Instead, he finds a city racked by police corruption and in the grips of organized crime consolidated by Roland Desmond, the gargantuan genius Blockbuster.

With a defenseless city to call his own, Nightwing decides to remain in Blüdhaven until Blockbuster's cartel is broken. This allows him to be close enough to Gotham to still be part of the Batman family, and far enough as well to have his own city, adventures and enemies. He takes a job as a bartender to keep his ear to the ground and worked closely with Oracle (Barbara Gordon) in an effort to clean up the town. Blockbuster places a sizable contract on Nightwing's head shortly thereafter, while Grayson plies the unscrupulous Blüdhaven Police Inspector Dudley Soames for information on the kingpin's dealings. Also during his time in Blüdhaven, Nightwing helps train a violent but enthusiastic street fighter called Nite-wing, who later kills an undercover FBI agent.

Last Laugh and killing the Joker
When the Joker is told he is dying by his doctor, he unleashes Joker juice on the inmates at the Slab, causing a breakout. At the end of the arc, Joker tries to kill Tim Drake. When Nightwing finds them, Joker gloats that he has killed this Robin and the other one. In rage and despair, Nightwing (who thinks Tim is dead) beats Joker to death. However, Batman manages to revive the Joker.

Leader of the League
Sometime after "No Man's Land" ends, the JLA disappears on a mission to locate Aquaman and Atlantis (The Obsidian Age). Before they vanish, Batman instigates a contingency plan, in which a handful of heroes would be assembled to create a new JLA, consisting of Nightwing, Green Arrow, the Atom, Hawkgirl, Major Disaster, Faith, Firestorm and Jason Blood. Nightwing is chosen to be leader until the original JLA are found, leading the group against the powerful Atlantean sorceress Gamemnae and helping to revive Aquaman to ask for his help in sinking Atlantis, but subsequently returns to the reserve list.

Graduation Day
For several years, Nightwing leads various incarnations of the Titans and becomes the most respected former sidekick in the DC Universe. However, in the Titans/Young Justice: Graduation Day crossover, a rogue Superman android kills Lilith and Troia, an event that tears apart both Young Justice and the Titans. At Troia's funeral, Dick declares he is tired of seeing friends die and disbands the team, officially ending the Titans. A few months later, Arsenal persuades Nightwing to join a new pro-active crime-fighting team: the Outsiders, who would hunt villains, acting as co-workers rather than an extended family. He reluctantly accepts.

Death of Blockbuster
Dick plays a key role in exposing the corruption in the Blüdhaven Police Department. Despite reaching his original goals, Dick continues as a police officer during the day while spending nights as Nightwing, pushing himself to his limits and straining his relationships. The line between his police work and his vigilantism began to blur, and ultimately Amy Rohrbach (his friend and superior officer, who knew his secret identity) fires him rather than let him continue using questionable methods.

Wrongfully blaming Nightwing for the death of his mother, the mob boss Blockbuster bombs Dick Grayson's apartment complex and promises to kill anyone in Dick's life. When the vigilante Tarantula arrives, Nightwing chooses not to stop her when she shoots the villain dead. He enters in a catatonic state after this action, and Tarantula takes advantage of his emotional trauma to rape him. At length, Nightwing shakes himself from his depression and takes responsibility for his inaction. He captures Tarantula and turns her and himself in to the police. Amy, however, feels the world needs Nightwing free and so prevents him from being charged.

Dick has destroyed the police corruption and removed the greater part of organized crime from this city, but his role in Blockbuster's death is still a source of tremendous guilt for him. He retires from crime fighting, with Tim Drake and Cassandra Cain as his replacements.

Grayson moves to New York, where he works closely with the Outsiders. After "insiders" threaten both the Outsiders and the newest incarnation of Teen Titans, however, Nightwing realizes that the team has gotten "too personal" and quits.

Infinite Crisis and 52
Due to a crisis of conscience, Dick adopts the new villainous persona of Renegade to infiltrate Lex Luthor's Secret Society of Super-Villains. This ruse includes Nightwing aligning himself with his long-time enemy Deathstroke to track the manufacturing and distribution of Bane's venom serum and to keep tabs on the Society's activities in Gotham and Blüdhaven. He also begins training (and subtly converting) Deathstroke's daughter, Ravager.

Deathstroke takes revenge on Nightwing when Blüdhaven is destroyed by the Society. The Society drops the super villain Chemo on the city, killing 100,000 people. Dick tries to rescue survivors but is overcome by radiation poisoning; only to be rescued himself by Batman. Nightwing confides that he let Blockbuster die and asks Batman to forgive him. Batman tells him that his forgiveness doesn't matter; Dick has to move beyond Blockbuster's death. Inspired by his mentor, he proposes to Barbara Gordon, who accepts his proposal with a kiss.

Batman then entrusts Nightwing to alert other heroes about the danger that the Crisis poses. Dick flies to Titans Tower, but due to the chaos resulting from the Blüdhaven disaster, the OMAC onslaught and other Crisis related events, the only hero who answers his call is Conner Kent. Together, they locate and attack Alexander Luthor's tower, the center of the Crisis, only to be repelled by Superboy-Prime. Prime is ready to kill Nightwing when Conner intervenes, sacrificing himself to destroy the tower, ending the destruction of the Universe.

During the Battle of Metropolis, Nightwing suffers a near-fatal injury from Alexander Luthor when he attempts to save Batman's life. Originally, the editors at DC intended to have Dick Grayson killed in Infinite Crisis as Newsarama revealed from the DC Panel at WizardWorld Philiadelphia:

Saved by the Justice Society, Nightwing recovers with Barbara at his side. As soon as he's able to walk again, Batman asks him to join him and Robin in retracing Bruce's original journey in becoming the Dark Knight. While Nightwing is hesitant, due to his engagement with Barbara, she encourages him to go and returns his engagement ring so he can make an honest decision for himself. Barbara feels that it is important he rediscover himself, and until he does they're not yet ready to be married. They part on good terms, though before he departs Dick leaves her an envelope containing a photograph of them as Robin and Batgirl, along with the engagement ring on a chain and a note promising he'll come back to her one day.

Soon after his journey with Batman and Robin ends, Nightwing returns to Gotham, following Intergang's trail. He works with the new Batwoman and Renee Montoya to stop Intergang from destroying Gotham, shutting off dozens of fire-spewing devices spread across the city.

"One Year Later"

One year later, Dick Grayson returns to New York City to find out who has been masquerading as Nightwing. The murderous impostor turns out to be the former Robin, Jason Todd. Grayson leads the Outsiders once again, operating undercover and globally.

Nightwing follows an armored thief named Raptor, whom he suspects is responsible for series of murders. Later, Raptor himself is murdered in a manner similar to the other victims by an unseen contract killer, who proceeds to bury Grayson alive. Nightwing frees himself, wondering the relation between his experience and a mysterious voice who tells him that he is "supposed to be dead". Nightwing is having trouble finding things to keep him busy during the day due to the cast on his right arm. Incapacitated from his injuries, he tries without luck to find jobs and continues to research into the mysterious assassin.

At one point, Dick agrees to attend a party for Bruce and their relationship seems to flourish. Bruce praises Dick for his success on the Raptor case, and also mentions to look into the Landman Building which hosted ex-Lexcorp scientists; most likely those who worked on the Raptor project. Dick also continues to keep a close brotherly relationship with Tim Drake, and helps Tim deal with his many losses during the last year.

After dealing with the Raptor issue, NYC is plagued by a villainous duo called Bride and Groom. Nightwing begins pursuit of these two after some grisly murders, including that of the Lorens family (close friends of his after the Raptor incident). Dick began to get obsessed with finding them, not knowing how far he was willing to go to take them down. Eventually, he formed a makeshift team with some "villains" to find them. They located them, and after killing some of his "team", Nightwing chased them to a cave, where Bride began a cave-in and the two are trapped there.

Nightwing, along with a group of former Titans, are summoned again by Raven to aid the current group of Teen Titans battle against Deathstroke, who was targeting the latest team to get at his children, Ravager and the resurrected Jericho. Nightwing and the other former Titans continue to work with the current team soon after the battle with Deathstroke so as to investigate the recent murder of Duela Dent.

When the Outsiders were targeted by Checkmate, Nightwing agrees that his team will work with the organization, so long as their actions in Africa are not used against them in the future. The mission however does not go as well as intended, resulting in Nightwing, the Black Queen and Captain Boomerang being captured by Chang Tzu. Later, Batman is called in by Mister Terrific who then rescues Nightwing and the others. Afterwards, Nightwing admits to Batman, that while he accepts that he is an excellent leader, he is not suited to lead a team like the Outsiders, and offers the leadership position to Batman.

Batman accepts the position; however, he feels that the team needs to be remade to accomplish the sorts of missions that he intends them to undertake. As such, he holds a series of tryouts for the team. The first audition involves Nightwing and Captain Boomerang who are sent to a space station under attack by Chemo. During the mission, a confrontation erupts between Nightwing and Boomerang, who has grown tired of fighting for redemption from people like Batman and Nightwing. After taking a beating from Nightwing, he manages to throw him into a shuttle heading for Earth and quits the team. Afterwards, Nightwing furiously confronts Batman. Batman does not deny his actions, and states that this is the sort of thing that the new Outsiders will have to deal with. At this, Nightwing resigns completely from the Outsiders, which Batman feels is best, judging Nightwing too good for that sort of life.

To help himself regain a sense of purpose, Nightwing opted to stay in New York City again, and play the role of the city's protector. He takes on a job as a museum curator; and uses the museum as his new base of operations. During his short time there, Dick finds himself once again confronted with Two-Face, who years ago delivered Dick's greatest defeat. This time however, Dick soundly defeats Two-Face.

"Titans Return"
Nightwing joins a new team of Titans, with the same roster of the New Teen Titans, to stop an offspring of Trigon, which has not yet been named, from enacting his vengeance over Raven and the Titans, of every generation. Nightwing yet again leads the team, and they manage to stop the sons of Trigon from accomplishing their first attempt at global destruction and again a few days later.

Following the defeat of Trigon's sons, the Titans are approached by Jericho who had been stuck inhabiting the body of Match, Superboy's clone. The Titans managed to free Jericho, but found themselves once again in trouble, due to the fact the Jericho's mind had become splintered due to all the bodies he had possessed in the past. Torn between evil and good, Jericho possesses Nightwing's body to keep from being captured. During this time, Jericho forces Nightwing to relive all of his greatest pains. Soon after, the JLA arrived, intent on taking Jericho in. Unfortunately they fail to apprehend him.

Following this, Nightwing decides to leave the team again, due to the events of the "Batman R.I.P." storyline, and due to Batman's apparent death, Nightwing feels his attention should be better aimed at protecting Gotham City.

"Batman R.I.P" and "Battle for the Cowl"
As a precursor to "Batman R.I.P.", at the New York Comic Con 2008, DC Comics gave away pins featuring Nightwing, Jason Todd, and Hush with the words "I Am Batman" beneath them. During the storyline, Nightwing is ambushed by the International Club of Villains. He is later seen in Arkham Asylum, frothing at the mouth and presumably drugged, believed by the staff to be Pierrot Lunaire, a member of the club. Scheduled for an experimental lobotomy by Arkham himself, he's spared by the ICoV taking hold of the Asylum, wanting to use him and Jezebel Jet, Bruce's fiancée at the time, as bait.

As Jezebel's capture is revealed to be a red herring, due to her being a part of the Black Glove, Nightwing's lobotomy is still pending, but he manages to escape by besting Le Bossu, and joining the fray between the Batman Family, the International Club of Heroes and the Black Glove itself. While he's forced to witness Batman's dragging down Simon Hurt's helicopter and seemingly die in a fiery explosion with his foe, he's shown holding Batman's cape, discarded during the fight.

Following the events of Batman's apparent death during Final Crisis, Nightwing has closed down shop in New York so as to return to Gotham. He has opted to give up on having a normal job, and instead intends to put all his effort into protecting the city. After his returns he confronts Two-Face and Ra's al Ghul, proving two of his mentor's greatest enemies that he is an equal to Batman after he defeated them. He also finds himself being tasked to raise Bruce's biological son Damian with Alfred.

During the events of the Battle for the Cowl, Nightwing is said to have become unapproachable and less emotional. He is seen by the Bat-Suit display cases, still mourning the loss of Batman. Nightwing is said to be resisting the idea that someone needs to take up the mantle of Batman, in spite of arguments from Robin and Alfred Pennyworth that it is necessary. It is later revealed he has no objections to becoming the new Batman, but was ordered not to in Bruce's prerecorded message for him, saying that Nightwing and Robin could carry the torch.

Robin later informs Grayson that someone is masquerading as Batman, using similar weaponry to their own. Nightwing is later forced to rescue Damian after he is ambushed by Killer Croc and Poison Ivy. However, Nightwing's glider is shot down, and the two are forced to crash land into a skyscraper. To give Damian time to escape, Nightwing offers himself up to the hit squad that is after them. He is about to be shot when he is rescued in a hail of gunfire by the Batman impersonator.

This eventually leads to Dick confronting Jason Todd, who has been posing as Batman. After a long battle between the two, Jason refuses Dick's help, while hanging on to a protruding ledge over Gotham's bay, Jason lets himself fall into the water. After returning to the cave, Dick assumes the identity of Batman, with Damian as the new Robin.

The New 52

In September 2011, The New 52 rebooted DC's continuity. In this new timeline, Grayson's costume changed the color of the "Nightwing symbol" from blue to red, and the emblem rolled over the shoulders, rather than traveling down the arm onto the middle and ring fingers. The costume also shifted from a skin-tight unitard look to an armored, full body suit, with spiked gauntlets such as Batman's rather than simply long gloves. Dick, along with all other members of the Batfamily, was a few years younger than previous incarnations. Despite being in his early twenties as opposed to his mid-late twenties, he was drawn a bit shorter than in his pre-relaunch frame. Starting with issue 19 there was a change in the suit.

After the events of Flashpoint as part of The New 52, Nightwing was relaunched with issue #1. Grayson resumes the role of Nightwing following the return of Bruce Wayne. The new series, written by Kyle Higgins, opens with Grayson having returned to Gotham, when Haly's Circus comes to town. Through a series of events, Grayson inherits the circus and is working through internal struggles with his past as he investigates the secrets the circus has brought about.

During the events of Death of the Family, a Batman Family crossover, Haly's circus is targeted by the Joker. As a result, the circus is burnt down and the circus members leave. Dick is left feeling depressed and lost as a result of this and the death of Damian Wayne, the new Robin, and is at a loss for what to do with his life. However, when Sonia Branch reveals to him that she believes her father, Tony Zucco, is alive and living in Chicago, Dick makes the decision to take him down. Therefore, in 2013 Nightwing relocated to Chicago to hunt down Tony Zucco and also take down The Prankster, a new supervillain hacker in Chicago.

As part of the Forever Evil storyline, Nightwing's identity is revealed on every electronic device in the world when Superwoman takes his mask off. Nightwing was captured prior when bringing Zsasz to Arkham Asylum and mistakes Owlman for Batman, which leads to Owlman knocking Grayson out. Currently, Grayson is being held captive by the Crime Syndicate. Owlman plans to ask Grayson to join them to fill in the spot of Earth-3 Richard Grayson who was Owlman's sidekick Talon who died when the Earth-3 vigilante Joker killed him and put his body parts in boxes for Owlman to find.

During his captivity, Nightwing is imprisoned in a containment unit built to hold Doomsday, with his heart monitored to set off a bomb should he attempt to escape. The alliance of Batman, Lex Luthor, Catwoman, Captain Cold, Bizarro, Sinestro, Black Manta and Black Adam break into the fallen Watchtower to free him but also to sabotage the Syndicate. When they are detected, the bomb is triggered to detonate in minutes. Batman tries to free Nightwing, but Luthor, believing there is no time, incapacitates Batman and Catwoman before suffocating Grayson until his vitals drop and he appears dead. The bomb is deactivated. An enraged Batman begins to brutalize Luthor, while Luthor tries to tell him that there may still be time to revive Dick before he is gone for good – and so they do. However, with his secret identity compromised, he gives up the Nightwing persona and is persuaded by Batman to fake his death and infiltrate the Spyral organization.

On January 21, 2014, DC Comics announced that the series would end in April with issue 30. It was succeeded by Grayson, a solo series focusing on Dick's exploits as an agent of Spyral. The series lasted until June 2016 and was succeeded by a new Nightwing series with DC Rebirth.

DC Rebirth

Following the erasure of the knowledge regarding his secret identity from most of the world in the final issue of Grayson
 Dick went back to the Nightwing identity in the DC Rebirth era solo series, and the costume's colors were changed back to the traditional black and blue. At the start of the series (rebirth) Nightwing is still a member of the Court of Owls (after Robin War) and he goes on missions around the world for the Court. They give him a partner named "Raptor" and like Nightwing he wears a costume, but he is much more violent than Dick and multiple times Dick has to try to stop him from killing. Throughout the story arc, Dick must work as an undercover agent but also has to keep his morals and not kill even if the Court tells him to. Later on in the series, an event causes him to lose his memory, which leads him to the name change of Ric Grayson and temporary retirement of the Nightwing alias.

Infinite Frontier

In March 2021, the series became part of DC's new relaunch Infinite Frontier. Tom Taylor became the new writer with Bruno Redondo as the artist. The series follows Dick Grayson's return to Blüdhaven as he fights crime while grappling with newfound responsibility from inheriting billions in wealth from Alfred Pennyworth. Dick begins to mentor Jon Kent and decides to use the money to launch a nonprofit organization named after Alfred to support the people of Blüdhaven, which puts him into conflict with Blockbuster and Heartless, a mysterious serial killer preying on the homeless. Dick also meets Melinda Zucco, his long lost half-sister who becomes Blüdhaven's mayor.

Dark Crisis (2022)

Collected editions

Most of the original ongoing Nightwing series was collected in several trade paperbacks while the series was being published. Beginning in 2014 the series was then reprinted, with the new editions including material that had been omitted from the previous run of trade paperbacks. Both the ongoing series Nightwing Vol. 3 and Nightwing Vol. 4 have been collected in trade paperbacks as well, during their publication.

Volume 1 and 2 (Post-Crisis)

Volume 3 (The New 52)

Volume 4 (DC Rebirth, post-Rebirth, and Infinite Frontier)

Prestige one-shots

 Nightwing: The Target
Batman/Nightwing: Bloodborne

Most of issues #71-100 of Nightwing Vol. 2 have yet to be compiled into any collected edition.

In addition to the dedicated Nightwing collected editions, many issues of the Nightwing ongoing series have also been included in other collected editions as part of crossovers.

Other collected editions

 Batman: Cataclysm (Nightwing Vol. 2 #19-20)
 Batman: New Gotham, Vol. 2: Officer Down (Nightwing Vol. 2 #53)
 Batman: Bruce Wayne: Murderer? (Nightwing Vol. 2 #65-66)
 Batman: Bruce Wayne: Fugitive Vol. 1 (Nightwing Vol. 2 #68-69)
 Batman: Bruce Wayne: Murderer? (New Edition) (Nightwing Vol. 2 #65-66, 68–69)
 Batman War Games Book 1 (Modern Edition) (Nightwing Vol. 2 #96)
 Batman War Games Book 2 (Modern Edition) (Nightwing Vol. 2 #97-98)
 Batman: The Resurrection of Ra's al Ghul (Nightwing Vol. 2 #138-139)
 Batman: Night of the Owls (Nightwing Vol. 3 #8-9)
 The Joker: Death of the Family (Nightwing Vol. 3 #15-16)
 Batman: Night of the Monster Men (Nightwing Vol. 4 #5-6)
 Dark Nights: Metal: The Resistance (Nightwing Vol. 4 #29)

In other media

Television 
 Nightwing appears in the DC Animated Universe, voiced by Loren Lester.
 Nightwing appears in The New Batman Adventures. At the end of the episode "Sins of the Father", Dick Grayson debuts when he remarks that "no one can be a boy wonder forever". In the episode "You Scratch My Back", Nightwing makes his full episode debut and finds an unlikely ally in Catwoman in trying to expose a South American gun smuggling operation into Gotham City. This episode highlights Nightwing, hints at his relationship with Batgirl (Barbara Gordon) and illustrates his tense relationship with Batman. In the episode "Old Wounds", Nightwing explains to Robin (Tim Drake) about his last day as Robin, that he fought with Batman over the latter's controlling nature and what the former saw as an unnecessarily harsh approach, causing Dick to leave Gotham as a result and returns years later as Nightwing. Eventually, he partially reconciles with Batman and works with him several times during the course of the series. A spin-off focused on the character and Catwoman was considered at one point.
 In Batman Beyond (set many years in the future), Nightwing's uniform (or at least a copy) hangs in the Batcave. In the episode "Lost Soul", Terry McGinnis borrows the Nightwing mask when his own Batsuit is controlled by an AI based on the long-dead businessman Robert Vance. In the film Batman Beyond: Return of the Joker, Batman asks if all of the original Batman's associates were bitter when they left to which Barbara Gordon replies "...look up Nightwing someday. Has he got stories". Barbara also mentions that Grayson had left Gotham following The New Batman Adventures prior to Robin's capture by Joker and Harley Quinn.
 Nightwing has a cameo appearance in the Justice League Unlimited episode "Grudge Match". As Black Canary enters Blüdhaven, Nightwing can be seen on a rooftop next to two gargoyles.
 Nightwing appears in the Teen Titans episode "How Long is Forever?", voiced by Scott Menville. Nightwing is Robin's identity twenty years in the future.
 Nightwing has been featured in The Batman, voiced by Jerry O'Connell. In the episode "Artifacts", the year 3027 have flashbacks to the year 2027 which features Nightwing. Although he has been active for a decade as Nightwing, he is still called 'Robin' by Batman and Oracle much to his annoyance. In the episode "The Metal Face of Comedy", Nightwing (in his original costume) appears as Dick Grayson's video game character in an online role playing game.
 Nightwing appears in Batman: The Brave and the Bold, voiced by Crawford Wilson. Dick Grayson initially appears as Robin, but becomes Nightwing at the end of the episode "Sidekicks Assemble!" and appears as Nightwing in later episodes. His suit is based on his Tales of the Teen Titans #44 suit.
A Nightwing animated series was in development before being shelved in favor of Young Justice.
Nightwing appears in Young Justice, voiced by Jesse McCartney. He is the leader of the Team, assigning missions to his friends and sometimes fighting side by side with them. At the end of season 2, Invasion, he leaves the team. Later in the third season, Dick Grayson is the leader of the Outsiders and worked behind the scenes with Batman Inc. In the fourth season, one year later, at twenty years old, he is called back to the original Team by topmost-level sorceress Zatanna to use his detective skills in finding Superboy and bringing him back from the Phantom Zone. Upon discovering Superboy alive, the team stumble on an evil plot by Superman's nemesis, General Zod, who leads an invasion on Earth with a small army of Kryptonian criminals. Thankfully, Nightwing, the Team, the Legion of Superheroes, and the Justice League band together and stop the Kryptonian villains by sending them back to the Phantom Zone. In the season finale, Nightwing later attends Superboy and Miss Martian's wedding.
 Brenton Thwaites portrays Dick Grayson in Titans where Grayson is a leader of the team. In the first-season episode "Asylum", Dick burns his Robin suit, later creating the Nightwing identity in the Season 2 finale.
 A reference of Nightwing is made by Lucius Fox in the Gotham episode "They Did What?" when he mentions the "Nightwing Project" to Bruce Wayne. It is essentially a clocking device that comes into play as Bruce and Selina put the device on Bane summoning bats to distract him as they escape.
 Nightwing appears in the third season of the HBO Max series, Harley Quinn, voiced by Harvey Guillén. He debuts in the episode, "There's No Ivy in Team", where he makes his return to Gotham and initially struggles to cooperate with the Bat Family, until they are forced to brave The Riddler's escape room alongside Harley Quinn and her crew.

Film

Live action

Batman film series 

In the character's second appearance within the film series, Batman & Robin, Dick Grayson pursues being a vigilante on his own and wears the Nightwing costume design. With Chris O'Donnell reprising the role from the previous film, the character continues to go by his Robin alias.

DC Extended Universe 

Warner Bros. Pictures is developing a Nightwing live action film centered on the character, set in the DC Extended Universe, with Bill Dubuque writing the script and The LEGO Batman Movie director Chris McKay signed on to direct.

Discussing why he likes the character and signed on for the project, McKay cited the character's showman personality and background as an entertainer and expressed his excitement for depicting that in the film. He later stated that he wants to introduce a complete adaptation of the character, something that hasn't been done in previous film interpretations of him before. McKay continued to state that the director-driven approach is why he loves Warner Bros., and how the franchise is differentiating itself from other popular shared universes. McKay also confirmed that the film would acknowledge the titular character's past from the source material, including his time as a part of Haly's Circus, and also reaffirmed that the film will be a straightforward action film with minimal use of CGI special effects and grounded realism.

Animation 
 Dick Grayson appears as Nightwing in Batman: Under the Red Hood, voiced by Neil Patrick Harris. He first appears to patrol Gotham alongside Batman, offering help when he found him fighting a group of smugglers. He was also present during one of the first battles with the Red Hood (Jason Todd), where he obtained an injury to his leg causing him to sit out of the final battle between Batman and Red Hood.
 Nightwing appears in the DC Animated Movie Universe, voiced by Sean Maher.
 In Son of Batman, he first appears to stop Damian Wayne from killing the defeated and severely wounded Ubu. After a prolonged battle (which happens off-screen, although a few shots are later seen during the credits), Nightwing manages to subdue and tie up the boy, although he ends up with a number of sizable sword cuts. At the end of the film, he pilots the Batwing to rescue Batman, Talia, and Damian.
 In Batman vs. Robin, Nightwing returns to help train Damian while Batman is busy investigating the Court of Owls. Dick is dating Starfire in this film (as he called her "Kori", matching the redhead image on his phone), who phones him and tries to entice him to come over to her place.
 In Batman: Bad Blood, Nightwing is forced to take Batman's place and don his spare costume during the time he's missing. He later helps Batman break free of the conditioning Tailia put him through. Given the call between him and Starfire, it would seem Bludhaven has had so much crime, they haven't had a chance to be intimate in some time.
 In Teen Titans: The Judas Contract, Nightwing is the leader of the team, alongside Starfire. He assists the Titans in taking on the threats of Brother Blood and Deathstroke.
 In Justice League Dark: Apokolips War, it was revealed that Nightwing died in the battle against Darkseid's army of Paradooms, along with most members of the Teen Titans. Attempting to stop a Paradoom from killing Robin, he was pinned down and impaled in his chest. Robin managed to revive him using the Lazarus Pits, but the progress also rendered Nightwing insane and mentally ill. He was later seen in the end of the film in front of the destroyed Titans Tower, still mentally unstable, but with a roboticized Starfire comforting him as the Flash rebooted their ruined world's timeline.
 Nightwing appears in the first three Batman Unlimited direct-to-video films (2015–2016), voiced by Will Friedle.
 Nightwing appears in Lego DC Comics Super Heroes: Justice League – Gotham City Breakout, voiced again by Will Friedle.
 In The LEGO Batman Movie, Robin (Dick Grayson) temporarily dons a spare Batsuit in the Batcave, which is called the "Nightwing" suit (similar to Superman's Nightwing uniform as an easter egg), during the Joker's takeover of Wayne Manor, while Batman is trapped in the Phantom Zone.
 In Batman and Harley Quinn, Nightwing is a main character in this film, alongside Batman and Harley Quinn. Nightwing helps Batman and Harley Quinn in attempting to stop the Floronic Man in his plot to turn all humans and animals into plant people. Nightwing is voiced by Loren Lester (reprising his role from the DC Animated Universe) and has a budding romance with Harley Quinn throughout the film.
 A Feudal Japan version of Nightwing appears in Batman Ninja, voiced by Adam Croasdell.
 During the end credits for Batman vs. Teenage Mutant Ninja Turtles, a comic cover with a picture of Nightwing appears with the caption "Raphael vs. Nightwing".
 Nightwing appears in Lego DC Batman: Family Matters, with Will Friedle reprising his role from various DC media.
 Nightwing appears in Teen Titans Go! vs. Teen Titans, with Sean Maher reprising his role from the DC Animated Movie Universe.

Miscellaneous 
Barbara Gordon appears as Nightwing alongside Batman in the Smallville "Detective" story arc of the Smallville: Season 11 series. This role was originally to be filled by Stephanie Brown, but DC editorial withdrew permission to use the character after her appearance had already been announced and solicited, necessitating Gordon to replace her. After Barbara is recruited by the Green Lantern Corps as a Blue Lantern, she asks her boyfriend, Dick Grayson, to be her successor as Nightwing and thus becoming Batman's replacement partner. Unlike previous depictions, Dick was never Bruce Wayne's ward and protégé as Robin, and was made reference that he was a former circus acrobat-turned-police officer who works for Gotham City Police Department.

Video games 
 Nightwing (Dick Grayson) appears in LEGO Batman: The Video Game as a playable character, voiced by James Arnold Taylor.
 Nightwing (Dick Grayson) appears in Batman: Rise of Sin Tzu as a playable character, voiced again by Loren Lester.
 Nightwing (Dick Grayson) appears in the MMORPG game DC Universe Online. He will assist the player in a battle against Bane if the player is using a Hero character, or he will attack the player if using a Villain character. Nightwing is also one of the many characters than can be unlocked to use in PvP Legends matches.
 Nightwing (Dick Grayson) is a downloadable character in Batman: Arkham City, with vocal grunts provided by Quinton Flynn. Nightwing has no relation to the story as he remains behind to protect Wayne Manor while Bruce Wayne is locked up in Arkham City and Robin (Tim Drake) is dealing with the outbreak caused by the Joker's poisoned blood.
 Nightwing (Dick Grayson) is a playable DLC character in LEGO Batman 2: DC Super Heroes, voiced by Cam Clarke.
 Nightwing is a playable character in Infinite Crisis.
 Nightwing appears as a playable fighter in Injustice: Gods Among Us, voiced by Troy Baker (mainstream version) and Neal McDonough (dark alternate counterpart). Dick Grayson is the mainstream version while Damian Wayne is the dark alternate counterpart.
 Nightwing (Dick Grayson) appears as a playable character in LEGO Batman 3: Beyond Gotham, voiced by Josh Keaton.
 Nightwing (Dick Grayson) is available as a playable character in Batman: Arkham Knight, voiced by Scott Porter, as part of the game's "dual play" feature. He also appears in the main story where he assists Batman in sabotaging the Penguin's weapons smuggling operation in Gotham. Nightwing stars in his own DLC story pack entitled GCPD Lockdown, set after the events of the main story, where he must prevent the Penguin from escaping the GCPD Detention Center. He is also featured in the Season of Infamy DLC mission revolving around Killer Croc, where he helps Batman investigate a prison airship that crash-landed in Gotham and apprehend Croc.
 The Lego Batman Movie version of Nightwing is playable in Lego Dimensions.
 The Damian Wayne version of Nightwing returns in Injustice 2, also voiced by Scott Porter. Damian primarily uses his Robin identity in the game while his Nightwing persona appears as a non-playable enemy in story, although Robin can obtain and equip his Nightwing gear.
 Nightwing "The Aerial Avenger" is also available as a playable character in DC Legends introduced during "Titans Month".
 Nightwing (Dick Grayson) is a playable character in Lego DC Super-Villains, voiced by Matthew Mercer.
 Nightwing (Dick Grayson) will be one of the four main playable characters in the 2022 video game, Gotham Knights.

Rides 
A Nightwing ride is currently in operation at Six Flags New England.

References

External links
Nightwing at DC Comics' official website

Comics characters introduced in 1963
DC Comics aliens
DC Comics martial artists
Kryptonians
2011 comics debuts
Fictional acrobats
Superheroes who are adopted
Characters created by George Pérez
Characters created by Marv Wolfman
Batman characters code names
Superman characters code names
Vigilante characters in comics